Nokia 6500 may refer to:

* Nokia 6500 (original), a mobile phone released in 2002
 Nokia 6500 classic, a mobile phone released in 2007
 Nokia 6500 slide, a slider version of the Nokia 6500 classic

fr:Nokia 6500